J. Waltham was an American actor. He appeared in 25 films between 1909 and 1913.

Filmography
The Gibson Goddess (1909)
The Rocky Road (1910) - in a bar
The Miser's Heart (1911) - on a street
 The Tender Hearted Boy (1913)

External links

Year of birth missing
Year of death missing
American male film actors
American male silent film actors
20th-century American male actors